Bulgan may refer to:

in Mongolia
 Bulgan Province, a province (aimag) of Mongolia
 Bulgan (city), the capital of the Bulgan province
 Bulgan Airport, the airport of Bulgan city
 Bulgan Gol, a upstream river of Ulungur River
 several districts (sums) in different provinces:
 Bulgan, Arkhangai
 Bulgan, Bayan-Ölgii
 Bulgan, Dornod
 Bulgan, Khovd
 Erdenebulgan, Khövsgöl
 Bulgan, Ömnögovi

other
 Bulgan, Azerbaijan